David Mello is an American musician known primarily for his work as drummer for the hardcore ska punk band Operation Ivy.

Prior to Operation Ivy, Mello played in various bands local to the Berkeley and Albany areas such as Rabbi Conspiracy and Distorted Truth

Upon Operation Ivy's formation, their first live appearances took place sequentially one weekend in May 1987. They first played in a garage in Albany, California that Mello had frequently used for his other musical projects. The same weekend, Operation Ivy with Mello on drums made their initial appearance at 924 Gilman Street. Mello continued to play in Operation Ivy until the band's breakup in 1989, citing unwanted attention as the primary cause.

Following the disbandment of Operation Ivy, the remaining members with the exception of Jesse Michaels temporarily formed another punk/ska band, Downfall. Downfall included Mello's brother Pat Mello, who previously assisted Operation Ivy with backup vocals on some songs during the recording of their only studio release, Energy. Dave and Pat Mello parted ways with Tim Armstrong and Matt Freeman, who went on to form Rancid, starting their own band Schlong. Additionally, Dave has toured with other bands as a stand-in when needed.

Mello has also been involved in drumstick production with the company Twotone Drumsticks, contributing to the design of the Dave Mello signature variety.

In more recent times, Mello continues to live in the East Bay area with his wife Sarah and son Maxwell. Still pursuing his musical aspirations, Dave regularly appears at 924 Gilman Street, playing with multiple groups including the bands Jewdriver and Un'Cus where Mello has traded in his sticks for a guitar.

References

1969 births
Living people
American male singers
American punk rock drummers
American male drummers
American punk rock singers
Operation Ivy (band) members
20th-century American drummers
Downfall (band) members
Shaken 69 members
Musicians from Oakland, California